Killswitch Engage is an American metalcore band from Westfield, Massachusetts, formed in 1999 after the disbanding of Overcast and Aftershock. Killswitch Engage's current lineup consists of vocalist Jesse Leach, guitarists Joel Stroetzel and Adam Dutkiewicz, bassist Mike D'Antonio, and drummer Justin Foley. The band has released eight studio albums and three live performance albums. Their eighth studio album, Atonement, was released on August 16, 2019.

Killswitch Engage rose to fame with its 2004 release The End of Heartache, which peaked at number 21 on the Billboard 200, and was certified gold by the RIAA in December 2007 for over 500,000 shipments in the United States. The title track, "The End of Heartache", was nominated for a Grammy Award in 2005 for Best Metal Performance, and a live DVD titled (Set This) World Ablaze was released in 2005. Killswitch Engage has performed at festivals such as Soundwave Festival, Wacken Open Air, Reading and Leeds Festivals, Ozzfest, Download Festival, Rock on the Range, Rock am Ring, Mayhem Festival, Monsters of Rock, Pointfest, Knotfest and Heavy MTL. The band has sold over four million records in the U.S. and has been considered notable within the New Wave of American Heavy Metal, and has also been considered one of the earliest leading forces of the metalcore genre.

History

Early years and debut album (1999–2001)
Killswitch Engage formed following the disbandment of metalcore bands Overcast and Aftershock in 1999. After Overcast broke up in 1998, bassist Mike D'Antonio collaborated with Aftershock guitarist Adam Dutkiewicz. Dutkiewicz, now playing drums, recruited guitarist Joel Stroetzel from Aftershock and vocalist Jesse Leach of the band Nothing Stays Gold (who were signed to a record label owned by Dutkiewicz's brother Tobias, who was also the vocalist in Aftershock) to form a new band, Killswitch Engage. The band's name is derived from an episode of the television series The X-Files entitled "Kill Switch", written by William Gibson, who gave the episode this title after meeting the industrial band Kill Switch...Klick.

In 1999, Killswitch Engage recorded a demo containing four tracks, including "Soilborn", the first song written by the band. The demo was first released at the band's first show, opening for melodic death metal act In Flames, in November 1999. They released their self-titled debut album the following year. Although initially the album was not a financial success and did not land on any charts, it attracted the interest of Carl Severson, who worked at Roadrunner Records at the time. Severson handed Killswitch Engage to several Roadrunner representatives. Mike Gitter, a talent agent of the company, contacted D'Antonio, attended several of the band's shows, and offered the band a recording contract with Roadrunner. Realizing that Roadrunner had the resources to promote and distribute Killswitch Engage releases, the band accepted his offer, declining several offers from smaller labels.

Line-up changes and Alive or Just Breathing (2001–2004)
For a brief time in 2000 and 2001, ex-Overcast guitarist Pete Cortese joined Killswitch Engage, but left when he became a father. Killswitch Engage began writing new material for their second album in November 2001. Mixed in January at Backstage Studios by producer Andy Sneap, the album was titled Alive or Just Breathing, after lyrics in the song "Just Barely Breathing". A music video for the single "My Last Serenade" increased the band's exposure, and the album peaked at number 37 on the Top Heatseekers chart.

Following Alive or Just Breathings release, the album having been written and recorded for two guitarists, the band decided to expand and become a fivesome; Dutkiewicz moved to guitar and former Aftershock drummer Tom Gomes filled in the vacant drummer position.  After Leach was married on April 20, 2002 and began touring again he fell into a depression. Leach left the band a few days before the band was meant to play a show and sent the band members an e-mail telling them he had quit. On Leach's end, he remarked "I didn't have the mental energy to face them, or even call them on the phone rather. I was at a point in my life where I just didn't want to face any of them so I wrote them a long email explaining, like, I'm just done", while D'Antonio said in an interview that "after three years of hanging out with the dude, and considering him a brother, to just get an email was a little bit harsh."

The band immediately started to search for a replacement vocalist and found Howard Jones of Blood Has Been Shed. Jones disliked the band's sound when he first heard it. He commented, "I was like, 'Meh.' I come from hardcore and dirtier metal, and Killswitch sounded so clean. But the more I listened to it, I realized there's some really good songs here". After hearing about Leach's vocal problems, Jones contacted the band and was accepted as the replacement. Philip Labonte of All That Remains tried out for lead vocals but lost to Jones, who had to quickly memorize seven songs for his debut at the 2002 Hellfest.

The new lineup played on the Road Rage tour in Europe in 2002 with 36 Crazyfists and Five Pointe O . Touring continued through the New Year's Day, and in 2003 the first song to feature Jones, "When Darkness Falls", appeared on the soundtrack of the 2003 horror film Freddy vs. Jason. Following the 2003 Ozzfest, drummer Gomes left the band because he wished to spend more time with his wife, to pursue his band Something of a Silhouette, and because he was tired of touring. He was replaced by Justin Foley of Blood Has Been Shed, and Foley's first tour with the band was the MTV2 Headbangers Ball in 2003.

The End of Heartache (2004–2006)
The End of Heartache was released on May 11, 2004, and peaked at number 21 on the Billboard 200 with 38,000 sales in its first week, and it also peaked at number 39 on the Australian Albums Chart. The album went on to sell more than 500,000 copies in the U.S and was certified gold on December 7, 2007. The album received mostly positive reviews, with Jon Caramanica of Rolling Stone calling the album a "stunning collection, retaining much of their signature musical brutality". Eduardo Rivadavia of AllMusic commented "riffs upon riffs are piled sky-high into each number that follows, it's the unpredictable rhythmic shifts used to build and then relieve internal pressure that fuel the Killswitch Engage power source".

"The End of Heartache" became the main single for the movie Resident Evil: Apocalypse, and in 2005 the song was nominated for Best Metal Performance for the 47th Grammy Awards. In late 2004, The End of Heartache was re-released as a special edition album, with a second disc featuring various live performances, a Japanese bonus track, and a re-recorded version of "Irreversal". During the summer of 2005, the band returned for Ozzfest, and on November 1, 2005, Alive or Just Breathing was re-released as part of Roadrunner Records' 25th anniversary. On November 22, 2005, the live DVD (Set This) World Ablaze was released, which contained a live concert at the Palladium in Worcester, Massachusetts, an hour-long documentary, and all the band's music videos. The DVD was certified gold in the US on April 8, 2006.

As Daylight Dies (2006–2007)
Killswitch Engage played the Reading and Leeds Festivals in August 2006, having already played Australian dates without Dutkiewicz, who was suffering from back problems and needed corrective surgery. On May 23, 2006, the song "This Fire Burns" was released on the WWE Wreckless Intent album. The track was intended to be the new theme song for WWE wrestler Randy Orton; however, it was scrapped and later became the theme song for the WWE Judgment Day 2006 pay-per-view. "This Fire Burns" was used as the entrance theme for WWE wrestler CM Punk (along with his stables the Straight Edge Society and The New Nexus) from 2006 until 2011 and was later re-released as "This Fire" on the As Daylight Dies Special Edition.

Recorded in three months, As Daylight Dies was released on November 21, 2006 and peaked at number 32 on the Billboard 200 chart with 60,000 sales in its first week. "As Daylight Dies" proved to be one of their biggest albums yet. It also entered the Australian Albums Chart at number 29. Mixed by Dutkiewicz, the album received mostly positive reviews—Thom Jurek of Allmusic called it "a Top Five metal candidate for 2006 for sure". Decibel Magazine contributor Nick Terry said "To call As Daylight Dies addictive would be an understatement. That it outdoes its already impressive enough predecessor could almost go without saying". Cosmo Lee of Stylus Magazine commented "the album is astonishingly badly sequenced", though he praised the album as being "less emotionally heavy-handed, and a lot more fun". As of November 27, 2007, As Daylight Dies has sold more than 500,000 units in the US.

The album's first single, "My Curse", peaked at number 21 on the Hot Mainstream Rock Tracks chart, and is featured in the video games Sleeping Dogs, Guitar Hero III: Legends of Rock, Burnout Dominator and Burnout Paradise and is available as downloadable content for the Rock Band series. "The Arms of Sorrow" peaked at number 31 on the same chart. The band's cover of Dio's "Holy Diver", originally recorded for a Kerrang! compilation album titled High Voltage, peaked at number 12 on the Mainstream Rock charts. Early in 2007, the band had to cancel three of its European tour dates with The Haunted due to Dutkiewicz's back problems. He required emergency back surgery and was replaced on the tour by Soilwork guitarist Peter Wichers.

Due to Dutkiewicz's back problems in early 2007, he was replaced by Damageplan and The Mercy Clinic frontman Patrick Lachman during the No Fear Tour. Dutkiewicz recovered and was able to finish the No Fear tour, and the band began filming its video for As Daylight Diess second single, "The Arms of Sorrow". On August 6, 2007, Dutkiewicz was forced to leave the Warped Tour so he could fully recover from his back surgery and continue daily physical therapy. He was replaced by Killswitch's guitar technician Josh Mihlek for select songs, until his return on August 14, 2007.

Second self-titled album (2007–2011)
Killswitch Engage entered the studio in October 2008 to start recording their next album with Dutkiewicz and Brendan O'Brien co-producing the album. In mid-February, bassist Mike D'Antonio confirmed in an interview with Metal Hammer that "drums were finished", and that he had "finished up the last few bass fixes". He also stated that Howard [Jones] was in Atlanta finishing vocals, and that "it shouldn't be too much longer now." From March to May, Killswitch Engage was a part of Disturbed's Music as a Weapon IV festival along with Lacuna Coil, Chimaira, Suicide Silence, Bury Your Dead and more. On April 14, the band announced the name of their album as Killswitch Engage, the second time the band has self-titled an album. The album was released on June 30, 2009, debuting at No. 7 on the Billboard 200, marking the band's highest chart position for an album. In July and August, Killswitch Engage took part in Mayhem Festival with headliners Marilyn Manson, Slayer, Bullet for My Valentine and others. In February 2010, Killswitch Engage announced that vocalist Howard Jones would not be performing with Killswitch Engage during their winter tour with The Devil Wears Prada and Dark Tranquillity; during the time, All That Remains vocalist Philip Labonte was substituting for Jones until he could return. At least one source speculated that Jones' hiatus was due to back pain. On March 18, 2010, original vocalist Jesse Leach returned to the band for a series of songs. From then on, Leach and Labonte performed as substitute vocalists for the remainder of the tour.

In 2010, the band contributed the track "My Obsession" to the God of War: Blood & Metal soundtrack. The band was later added as late replacement to 2010's Download Festival in June, after original sub-headliner, Wolfmother could not attend as scheduled. Afterward, Killswitch Engage took a break from the road, and its members pursued other interests. Adam Dutkiewicz formed the band Times of Grace with Leach and released the debut album "The Hymn of a Broken Man" on January 18, 2011. Along with Dutkiewicz and Leach, Times of Grace added Joel Stroetzel to their tour lineup. Justin Foley provided the drum tracking for the band Unearth on their album "Darkness in the Light", released on July 5, 2011. Foley also traveled with the band for their 2011 summer tour. D'Antonio started the hardcore band Death Ray Vision, with Shadows Fall vocalist Brian Fair and former Killswitch Engage guitarist Pete Cortese.

Jones' departure, Leach's return and Disarm the Descent (2011–2015)
In an interview with FTC, Gun Shy Assassin, Mike D'Antonio had stated that the band was currently in the works for a sixth studio album. D'Antonio stated, "Currently, everyone is individually writing demos for the next Killswitch Engage record. There is no release date yet, but I would assume it will be out early 2012." Adam Dutkiewicz followed that up with a statement on the Killswitch Engage Facebook, saying "YO! Its Adam D! We're about to begin writing our new record. Thanks to all of our fans for waiting so friggin' patiently...now let's turn on the "riff faucet" and RAGE!" On December 1, 2011, Mike D'Antonio posted online that Killswitch Engage should be entering the studio around February/March 2012 to record their sixth album expected around summer 2012.  He also stated that the band had eight demos finished for the new record.

On January 4, 2012, the band announced via the band's official website, along with their other official sources, that Howard Jones had left the band after his nine-year membership with them. In the statement, the band did not disclose the reason for this decision out of respect for Jones, but simply thanked him for his nine years with the band and wished him well, as well as thanking the fans for their support as they began the search for a new lead singer; Jones later explained he departed the band to manage his type 2 diabetes which was worsened by a hectic touring lifestyle. Soon after the announcement of Jones's departure, rumors began that Phil Labonte of All That Remains would officially take over lead vocals due to his previous history with the band, although Labonte quickly dispelled the rumor. Many vocalists were considered in the search for a new one for the band. The band's search for a new singer concluded in February with the announcement that original lead vocalist Jesse Leach would return to the band, as the band felt that Leach's energy, as well as his overall comfort and command of both the old and new material, made him the clear choice during auditions. Following Leach's return, the band continued to the process of recording their new album and touring. On April 22, 2012, the band performed Leach's first show since 2002 at the New England Metal and Hardcore Fest.

On June 20, 2012, the demo version of a new song titled "This Is Confrontation" was leaked on YouTube. Not long after the song was leaked, the videos were soon deleted. Later, the band took part in Metal Hammer's  "Trespass America Festival" headlined by Five Finger Death Punch with additional support from God Forbid, Emmure, Pop Evil, Trivium and Battlecross. The band performed this song live, confirming the song's title "No End in Sight". Not long after the album was confirmed, the song was streamed publicly again. In October 2012, with Jesse back at the helm, Killswitch Engage announced they would be celebrating the ten-year anniversary of their seminal album Alive or Just Breathing with a US Tour through November/December 2012, in which the band played the album live in its entirety. Support on the tour came from fellow Massachusetts natives Shadows Fall and Acaro.

The album Disarm the Descent was released April 1, 2013 in the UK. The album debuted at #15 in the UK charts while debuting at #7 in the Billboard top 200 April 2 in the US. The first single "In Due Time" was released on February 5, 2013. The album has received critical acclaim from reviewers, and has been labeled as a "true standout" and "nothing short of amazing". It was announced in December 2013 that "In Due Time" was nominated for "Best Metal Performance" at the 2014 Grammy Awards, but lost to "God Is Dead?" by Black Sabbath. A tour in May 2013 was done to promote the new album. With Miss May I, Darkest Hour, The Word Alive and Affiance as support. As I Lay Dying was originally supposed to be on the tour but dropped due to criminal charges from frontman Tim Lambesis. The band also did a co-headliner with fellow Heavy Metal act Lamb of God in the October 2013 with Testament and Huntress as support for both bands. The band did a small headliner on the east coast for Halloween 2014, with All That Remains, Death Ray Vision and City of Homes supporting.

Incarnate (2015–2017)

In an interview with Wikimetal, Jesse Leach announced that the band will start demoing new material "in the coming months".

On February 25, 2015, the band released a 40-second snippet of a new single titled "Loyalty".  The track appears on the Catch The Throne: The Mixtape Volume 2 to promote the HBO TV series Game of Thrones.  The mixtape also features appearances from various other metal and rap acts such as Anthrax and Snoop Dogg.

On March 30, 2015, Mike D'Antonio stated that the band had completed demoing material for its next studio album.

Killswitch Engage took part in a summer tour in July 2015, opening up for Rise Against with support from letlive.

On December 10, 2015, the band premiered a new song entitled "Strength of the Mind" on Revolver. The band also did a small Christmas 2015 tour on the East Coast with Unearth, Act of Defiance and '68.

On December 16, 2015, it was revealed that the band's upcoming seventh album, released on March 11, 2016, would be titled Incarnate, with a tour being took part in March of that year with Memphis May Fire and 36 Crazyfists as supporters.

On September 27, 2016, Leach revealed on his Instagram page that the band would be releasing a documentary compiled of live footage since 2012.

On November 25, 2016, the band released a Blu-ray/CD called Beyond The Flames: Home Video Vol.2. The Blu-ray contains live performances that were recorded around the world from 2012 to 2016 and an hour long documentary taking place right after the band's (Set This) World Ablaze had left off, as well as music videos, band member profiles and more, plus a bonus live CD containing live tracks from the band's legendary 2014 Monster Mosh show. The two disc set had a one day exclusive sale in record stores everywhere on Black Friday. The set is now available for online purchase and digital download on the Killswitch Engage store.

Atonement (2017–present)
On August 30, 2017, the band announced on their Instagram page that they were in the process of demoing material for their upcoming eighth studio album.

In April 2018, it was revealed that their former singer Howard Jones will appear on their new album performing a duet with Jesse Leach during a song that was revealed to be titled "The Signal Fire".

The band cancelled their tour dates from April 26 to May 5 due to the need of vocalist Jesse Leach undergoing surgery on his vocal cords.

During an interview with the Wall of Sound: Up Against the Wall podcast in October 2018, Jesse Leach revealed more details about the song with former singer Howard Jones stating: "He does a verse, I do a verse, we sing the chorus together it's a real heavy shitkicker" and that the song was inspired by Howard's new band name Light the Torch and their friendship. On April 24, 2019, the band posted on their Instagram that the follow up to the 2016 album Incarnate would be released in the autumn.

According to Music Week, the band has signed with Metal Blade Records for the USA, Music for Nations for the UK, and an international contract with Columbia/Sony. These labels released the band's eighth studio album, Atonement, on August 16, 2019.

On August 20, 2019, the band released their music video for Atonement's third single "The Signal Fire", the song they recorded with former frontman Howard Jones (now of Light the Torch).

Musical style, influences, and lyrical themes

Killswitch Engage's musical style has been described as metalcore and melodic metalcore. Like some 2000s metalcore bands, Killswitch Engage vocally combine singing, screaming vocals, and growls in their music. In 2009, MTV, while naming "The Greatest Metal Bands of All Time", said that Killswitch Engage have been "called one of the founders of metalcore". Jason D. Taylor of AllMusic said Alive or Just Breathing is "a pure metal album that seemingly has ignored any fashionable trend and instead relies solely on skill and expertise to sculpt some of the meatiest heavy metal since the glory days of Metallica and Slayer." 

Both current vocalist Jesse Leach and former vocalist Howard Jones write lyrics that are considered positive. Jesse Leach stated on (Set This) World Ablaze, that the lyrics contain "unity, positivity, [and] love." On the lyrical themes of Killswitch Engage, Ultimate Guitar reviewer Amy Sciarretto noted:

On Killswitch Engage's 2009 self-titled album, Howard Jones states the change in lyrical themes:
 Killswitch Engage's influences include Van Halen, Black Sabbath, Pantera, Fear Factory, Carcass, At the Gates, Machine Head, Crowbar, Neurosis, Metallica, Iron Maiden, HIM, Megadeth, Suicidal Tendencies, Anthrax, Slayer, Testament, Cannibal Corpse, Bad Brains, Agnostic Front, Leeway, and Sick of It All. Both Leach and Jones cited Faith No More singer Mike Patton as their biggest influence. 

Jesse Leach has talked about the band's label of metalcore, stating: "I never liked the term 'metalcore.' I don't think it's an accurate representation of the wide variety of bands that get lumped under that category. But I get it. People have to categorize stuff and put it into their own little category so they can describe stuff to somebody else. I like to say we're more of a metal band. It is what it is. People are going to use that term whether I like it or not."

Band members

Current
 Mike D'Antonio – bass (1999–present)
 Adam Dutkiewicz – lead guitar (2002–present); backing vocals (1999–present); drums (1999–2002)
 Joel Stroetzel – rhythm guitar, backing vocals (2002–present); lead guitar (1999–2002)
 Jesse Leach – lead vocals (1999–2002, 2012–present)
 Justin Foley – drums (2003–present)

Former
 Pete Cortese – rhythm guitar (2000–2001)
 Tom Gomes – drums (2002–2003)
 Howard Jones – lead vocals (2002–2012)

Live
 Patrick Lachman – lead guitar, backing vocals (2007)
 Philip Labonte – lead vocals (2010)
 Jordan Mancino – drums (2013)
 Josh Mihlek – rhythm guitar (2019)

Timeline

Discography

 Killswitch Engage (2000)
 Alive or Just Breathing (2002)
 The End of Heartache (2004)
 As Daylight Dies (2006)
 Killswitch Engage (2009)
 Disarm the Descent (2013)
 Incarnate (2016)
 Atonement (2019)

Awards and nominations
Grammy Award

!
|-
| 2005 || The End of Heartache || Best Metal Performance || 
| 
|-
| 2014 || In Due Time || Best Metal Performance || 
| style="text-align:center;" rowspan="2"|
|-
| 2019 || Unleashed || Best Metal Performance || 

Metal Hammer Golden Gods Awards

!
|-
| 2004 || Killswitch Engage || Best International Act || 
| 
|-
| 2004 || The End of Heartache || Best Album || 
| 
|-
| 2007 || Killswitch Engage || Best International Band || 
| 
|-
| 2014 || Killswitch Engage || Best Live Band || 
| 

Boston Music Awards

!
|-
| 2007 || Killswitch Engage || Outstanding Metal/Hardcore Band of the Year || 
| style="text-align:center;" rowspan="2"|
|-
| 2007 || Killswitch Engage || Act of the Year || 
|-
| 2007 || As Daylight Dies || Album of the Year (Major) || 
| style="text-align:center;" rowspan="2"|
|-
| 2007 || Howard Jones || National Male Vocalist of the Year  || 

Loudwire Music Awards

!
|-
| 2013 || Disarm the Descent || Metal Album of the Year || 
| style="text-align:center;" rowspan="3"|
|-
| 2013 || In Due Time || Metal Song of the Year || 
|-
| 2013 || Killswitch Engage || Metal Band of the Year ||

References

External links

1999 establishments in Massachusetts
Metalcore musical groups from Massachusetts
Heavy metal musical groups from Massachusetts
Musical groups established in 1998
Roadrunner Records artists
Musical quintets
Metal Blade Records artists
Ferret Music artists